Turkey Creek, Texas may refer to the following places:

Turkey Creek, a creek in Kinney County, Texas
Turkey Creek, Johnson County, Texas

See also 
 Turkey Creek (disambiguation)